Malik ibn Aus Al-Hadathan An-Nasri was one of the tabi'in and one of the narrators of hadith, often quoted by Ibn Shihab al-Zuhri.

References

Tabi‘un
Tabi‘un hadith narrators
8th-century Arabs